The Petersgrat is a mountain of the Bernese Alps, located on the border between the Swiss cantons of Bern and Valais. It consists of a large ridge, which is entirely covered by ice. The northern side belongs to the basin of the large Kander Glacier. On the southern side (Lötschental) the glacier is smaller and is named Tellingletscher.

The Petersgrat is a popular destination for heliskiing and snow landing.

References

External links
 Petersgrat on Hikr

Bernese Alps
Mountains of the Alps
Alpine three-thousanders
Mountains of Switzerland
Mountains of Valais
Mountains of the canton of Bern
Bern–Valais border